Garlock may refer to:

People with the surname
Dorothy Garlock (1919–2018), author
Ryan Garlock (born 1986), professional hockey player

Other uses
Garlock, California
Garlock Sealing Technologies, a subsidiary of EnPro Industries
Garlock Fault, fault running along the north margins of the Mojave Desert